Christian Haas may refer to:

 Christian Haas (sprinter) (born 1958), German sprinter
 Christian Haas (footballer) (born 1978), German footballer
 Christian Ludwig "Chrislo" Haas (1956–2004), German musician

See also
 Christian Haass (born 1960), German biochemist